Lulu (also released in the UK as No Orchids for Lulu) is a 1962 Austrian crime drama film written and directed by Rolf Thiele. The film is an adaptation of Frank Wedekind's Lulu plays—Earth Spirit (Erdgeist, 1895) and Pandora's Box (Die Büchse der Pandora, 1904)—and stars Nadja Tiller (as Lulu), O. E. Hasse, and Hildegard Knef.

Sadoul's Dictionary of Films describes Thiele's work as "[a] heavy-handed, almost absurd version" of Wedekind's plays. But Robert von Dassanowsky credits Lulu as one of the "few notable [Austrian] dramas during the early 1960s".

Plot
The story of a sexually enticing young dancer who rises up in society through her relationships with wealthy men, but later falls into poverty and prostitution, culminating in an encounter with Jack 'the Ripper'.

Cast
 Nadja Tiller: Lulu
 O. E. Hasse: Dr. Schön
 Hildegard Knef: Gräfin Geschwitz
 Mario Adorf: Rodrigo
 Charles Regnier: Jack the Ripper
 Rudolf Forster: Schigolch
 Leon Askin: Medizinialrat Dr. Goll
 Sieghardt Rupp: Maler Schwarz
 Claus Höring: Alva Schön

References

External links

1962 films
1962 crime drama films
Austrian crime drama films
Films directed by Rolf Thiele
Films based on works by Frank Wedekind
Films set in the 1900s
Films set in Germany
Films set in Paris
Films set in London
1960s German-language films